The 2015 WAC men's soccer tournament was the 7th edition of the tournament. It determined the Western Athletic Conference's automatic berth into the 2015 NCAA Division I Men's Soccer Championship.

The Seattle Redhawks won the tournament, besting the Utah Valley Wolverines in the championship match.

Qualification 

The top six teams in the Western Athletic Conference based on their conference regular season records qualified for the tournament.

Bracket

Schedule

Quarterfinals

Semifinals

Championship

Statistical leaders

Top goalscorers

Tournament Best XI 

Danny Musovski, So., F, UNLV
 Kevin Partida, Jr., MF, UNLV
 Nick Clever, Jr., GK, CSU Bakersfield
 Mario Iniguez, Sr., D/MF, CSU Bakersfield
 Alex Neff, Jr., D, Utah Valley
 Skyler Milne, Jr., F, Utah Valley
 Connor Salmon, So., MF, Utah Valley
 Cameron Rohani, Jr., MF, Seattle U
 Sergio Rivas, Fr., MF, Seattle U
 Kyle Bjornethun, Jr., D, Seattle U
 MVP: David Olsen, So., F, Seattle U

See also 
 Western Athletic Conference
 2015 Western Athletic Conference men's soccer season
 2015 NCAA Division I men's soccer season
 2015 NCAA Division I Men's Soccer Championship

References 

tournament 2015
Western Athletic Conference Men's Soccer
2015